Douglas Aziz Shamasha Eshaya (born 1 January 1942) is an Iraqi former football player and caretaker coach. He represented the Iraq national team, and is ethnically Assyrian.

Club career 
He was a pillar for club and country during the late 1960s and through the 1970s. He made his league debut in 1964 and spent 15 inspiring seasons with Aliyat Al-Shorta in the Iraq Central FA League and Al-Shorta in the Iraqi Premier League, where he was a key figure in the side along with Abid Kadhim, Majeed Ali, Latif Shandal and Riyadh Nouri. He became the first outfield player in the Iraqi League to play as a goalkeeper when he was forced to go in goal for the final few minutes of a 5-2 win over Al-Tijara after an injury to Raad Hammoudi.

International career 
After making his international debut in 1967, Douglas quickly became a key influence as the midfield general in the heart of the Iraqi team. With the national team, he played in the 1974 World Cup qualifiers in Australia, where Iraq finished second behind the hosts, the 1972 and 1976 Asian Cups in Thailand and Iran, and in the Olympic qualifiers in 1968 and 1972. Douglas was also an important part of the Iraqi army team that won the 1972 and 1977 CISM World Military Championship. Douglas played for the Iraqi national team until 1978 and retired from playing a year later.

Managerial career 
He went on to coach at Al-Shurta and in his first season in charge, led the club to their first ever league title in 1979-1980. He continued to coach the club's youth teams after stepping down as head coach in 1983, but was renamed coach of the first team in 1985. In 1989, he stepped down as coach of Al-Shurta to work full-time as assistant to Under-19s coach Bill Asprey. Douglas was also assistant coach to Ammo Baba in the national team set-up from 1983–1984. He coached Al-Khutot, Salah-Al-Deen and Al-Karkh in the 1990s before leaving Iraq to settle in Arnhem, the Netherlands.

Career statistics

International
Scores and results list Iraq's goal tally first.

References

External links
 

1942 births
Living people
Iraqi footballers
Iraq international footballers
1972 AFC Asian Cup players
1976 AFC Asian Cup players
Iraqi football managers
Iraq national football team managers
Iraqi Christians
People from Al Anbar Governorate
Al-Shorta SC players
Al-Shorta SC managers
Al-Karkh SC managers
Association football defenders
Association football midfielders
Assyrian footballers
Al-Ramtha SC managers